Pakistan Automobiles Corporation (sometimes abbreviated to PACO) were a first-class cricket side that played in the Patron's Trophy, the Quaid-e-Azam Trophy and the Pentangular Trophy between 1983–84 and 1993-94. Their most successful era was in the early 1980s under the captaincy of Shahid Mahboob.

In all they played 83 first-class matches, with 20 wins, 21 losses and 42 draws. Their highest score was 201 not out by Ijaz Ahmed against Karachi in 1984-85. The best bowling figures were 8 for 65 by Shahid Mahboob against House Building Finance Corporation in 1986-87. He also took seven wickets in an innings for Pakistan Automobiles Corporation on seven occasions, and in 59 matches for the team took 270 wickets at an average of 27.02.

Honours 
  Patron's Trophy (1) 
 1982-83 (not considered first-class in this season)
 Pentangular Trophy (1) 
 1984-85 (not considered first-class in this season)

See also
 List of Pakistan Automobiles Corporation cricketers

References

External links
 First-class matches played by Pakistan Automobiles Corporation 
 Other matches played by Pakistan Automobiles Corporation 

Pakistani first-class cricket teams
Former senior cricket clubs of Pakistan
Cricket clubs established in 1983
1983 establishments in Pakistan
Cricket clubs disestablished in 1994
1994 disestablishments in Pakistan